Curtis Robb (born 7 June 1972) is a former British middle distance runner, who competed at two consecutive Summer Olympics for Great Britain, in 1992 and 1996.

Running career
Robb first began running with Liverpool Harriers & AC, a racing team based in Liverpool, at the age of 12. From the age of 17, he was coached by Ernie Gallagher, a former miler who had raced Roger Bannister in the 1950s. Robb made his Olympic debut in the men's 800 meters at the 1992 Summer Olympics, where he finished sixth overall. At the 1993 World Championships in Athletics, Robb raced in the men's 800 metres, where he was involved in a controversy in his semi-final after cutting in front of Johnny Gray, with Gray losing his step. In the men's 800 at the 1996 Summer Olympics, Robb made it to the semifinal round, but did not make it to the final round.

After his racing career, Robb became a surgeon. In this role he operated on the glutes of GB international orienteer Charlie Adams.

References

External links
GB Olympic Committee

1972 births
Living people
British male middle-distance runners
Athletes (track and field) at the 1992 Summer Olympics
Athletes (track and field) at the 1996 Summer Olympics
Olympic athletes of Great Britain
Universiade medalists in athletics (track and field)
People educated at Liverpool College
Sportspeople from Liverpool
Universiade silver medalists for Great Britain
Medalists at the 1991 Summer Universiade